Grover Center was originally built to be the home for the Ohio Bobcats men's basketball team. The first men's basketball game in the arena featured the Ohio Bobcats hosting the previous years national champion Ohio State Buckeyes on December 1, 1960 to a sold out crowd. The Ohio Bobcats basketball team only called the Grover Center home from 1960–68 after the much larger Convocation Center opened up December 3, 1968.  It is named after former Bobcat coach Butch Grover.

Renovations
The total cost of the 5 year renovation was $24.5 million.

References

External links
 Gover Center at Ohio University

Ohio Bobcats men's basketball
Buildings and structures of Ohio University
Buildings and structures completed in 1960
1960 establishments in Ohio